Chalkville is a former census-designated place in Jefferson County, Alabama, United States. At the 2000 census the population was 3,829. The area is now part of the city of Clay.

Geography
Chalkville is located at  (33.667902, -86.649643).

Demographics
As of the census of 2000, there were 3,829 people, 1,275 households, and 1,105 families residing in the community. The racial makeup of the community was 96.32% White, 2.32% Black or African American, 0.24% Native American, 0.47% Asian, 0.05% Pacific Islander, 0.08% from other races, and 0.52% from two or more races. 0.57% of the population were Hispanic or Latino of any race.

There were 1,275 households, out of which 49.5% had children under the age of 18 living with them, 74.1% were married couples living together, 9.9% had a female householder with no husband present, and 13.3% were non-families. 10.9% of all households were made up of individuals, and 2.7% had someone living alone who was 65 years of age or older. The average household size was 2.97 and the average family size was 3.21.

In the community, the population was spread out, with 29.8% under the age of 18, 7.7% from 18 to 24, 32.9% from 25 to 44, 22.4% from 45 to 64, and 7.2% who were 65 years of age or older. The median age was 35 years. For every 100 females, there were 95.9 males. For every 100 females age 18 and over, there were 93.9 males.

The median income for a household in the community was $55,114, and the median income for a family was $56,518. Males had a median income of $34,977 versus $29,266 for females. The per capita income for the community was $19,929. About 2.8% of families and 2.3% of the population were below the poverty line, including none of those under age 18 and 12.9% of those age 65 or over.

Government and infrastructure
The Alabama Department of Youth Services formerly maintained the Chalkville Campus. It ended operations after a tornado in January 2012.

References

Unincorporated communities in Alabama
Geography of Jefferson County, Alabama
Birmingham metropolitan area, Alabama